Grumo may refer to several places:

Italy
Grumo Appula, a municipality in the Province of Bari, Apulia
Grumo Nevano, a municipality in the Province of Naples, Campania
Grumo (San Michele all'Adige), a civil parish of San Michele all'Adige (TN), Trentino-South Tyrol

Switzerland
Grumo (Torre), a village and former municipality merged in Torre and from 2006 part of Blenio, Ticino